Alice Merryweather (born October 5, 1996) is a World Cup alpine ski racer from the United States, and competes primarily in the speed events, downhill and super-G. Born and raised in Hingham, Massachusetts, she graduated from Stratton Mountain School in Vermont and plans to attend Dartmouth College 

Merryweather won the gold medal in the downhill at the World Junior Championships in 2017. She was named to the 2018 U.S. Olympic Team, and was fifteenth in the combined event.  She made her first World Cup top ten in January 2019 with an eighth in the downhill at Garmisch, Germany.

World Cup results

Season standings

Top twenty results
 
 2 top tens 
 11 top twenty finishes

World Championship results

Olympic results

References

External links

Alice Merryweather World Cup standings at the International Ski Federation

Alice Merryweather at the U.S. Ski Team

1996 births
Alpine skiers at the 2018 Winter Olympics
American female alpine skiers
Living people
Olympic alpine skiers of the United States
People from Hingham, Massachusetts
Sportspeople from Plymouth County, Massachusetts
21st-century American women